Yang Aihua (born 1977) is a former swimmer from China who won the gold medal in the 400 meters freestyle at the 1994 World Aquatics Championships in Rome.

Biography 
In November 1994, Yang was suspended for two years after testing positive for testosterone before the 1994 Asian Games in Hiroshima, Japan.

References

1977 births
Living people
Chinese female freestyle swimmers
World Aquatics Championships medalists in swimming
Doping cases in swimming
Swimmers at the 1994 Asian Games
Asian Games competitors for China